Angel Maksimov (born 16 January 1997) is a Bulgarian footballer who plays as a midfielder.

References

External links
 

1997 births
Living people
Bulgarian footballers
First Professional Football League (Bulgaria) players
PFC Rilski Sportist Samokov players
FC Vereya players
Association football midfielders